Melbourne University Hockey Club (MUHC), is a field hockey club affiliated with the University of Melbourne in Victoria, Australia. The club wears the colours blue and black.

Established in 1907, the club first competed in the Victorian Amateur Hockey Association (men) and Victorian Women's Hockey Association. In 1908, the first inter-varsity game was played in Adelaide. As of 2016, the club compete in the Hockey Victoria men's and women's winter and summer competitions and the Australian University Games.

References

External links
 

Australian field hockey clubs
Hockey
Mel
1907 establishments in Australia
Field hockey clubs established in 1907
Sporting clubs in Melbourne
Field hockey in Victoria (Australia)
Sport in the City of Melbourne (LGA)